Sideways (Derek James) is a superhero created by writers Dan DiDio, Justin Jordan, and artist Kenneth Rocafort who appears in media published by DC Comics.

Publication history
The character debuted in Sideways #1, which was originally promoted in spring 2017 as part of a group of new comic series set for release in fall 2017. They were branded as the "Dark Matter" line and their stories follow events from the Dark Nights: Metal crossover. In November 2017, the line was rebranded as "The New Age of DC Heroes" and publication was delayed until early 2018.

The first issue of Sideways was published February 14, 2018. Like the other first issues in the line, it featured a vertical gatefold cover. When closed, the cover shows Sideways exiting a portal in the sky. When opened, additional characters can be seen on the ground below him and in the sky above him.

Sideways appeared in the background of a group shot in Dan Jurgens' story in Action Comics #1000.

Writer Grant Morrison co-wrote the series' first and only annual with Didio. The annual was released in November 2018.

The series ended in February 2019 with its 13th issue.

He appeared one month later in Heroes in Crisis.

Fictional character biography
Within the context of the stories, while on a trip to Gotham with his adoptive mother, Derek James, a Puerto Rican high school student, falls through a dimensional rift into the dark matter dimension following the events of Dark Nights: Metal. As a result, he gains the power to travel through dimensions and create rifts that can act as small barriers. Derek is best friends with a girl named Ernestine, and is unpopular in school, as well as adopted.

A few months after Derek James acquires his powers, he is video recording his powers when he meets a being known as Tempus Fuginaut who accuses Derek of causing tears in reality. Derek escapes but he dislocates his shoulder, and he goes to his best friend Ernestine for help. Ernestine takes him to the hospital, where Derek's adoptive mother arrives worrying for him. Suddenly, a mentally unstable woman name Killspeed breaks out and kills several hospital staff members in order to take some money for her cancer. Derek puts his Sideways costume on and they fight, with Sideways defeating her. When the police arrive, Sideways uses his Rift abilities to teleport, but he accidentally severs Killspeed's arm.

A few weeks later, Derek teams up with Hot Spot, a former Teen Titan, to take down a man named Replicant who can replicate superpowers. Replicant accidentally kills himself when he creates multiple rifts on top of his body, and Sideways gains popularity. In issue #5, Sideways is called out by a villain name Showman who gains power the more people are angry. With quick thinking from Erin, she calms the audience, which allows Sideways to teleport Showman to a different location where he defeats him. In issue #6, Derek is overwhelmed with stress and doesn't talk to his adoptive mother, but finds out she was killed by people who were investigating him.

In the final issues, Sideways manages to find out the people who killed his mother, and defeat most of them. In Young Justice #13, Derek joins the Young Justice team.

Later his ability is instrumental in saving Black Adam at the Legion of Doom from Deathstroke's Dark Army, during the Dark Crisis event.

Powers and abilities 
Due to Derek falling through the Dark Multiverse during the Dark Nights: Metal event, he acquired several powers involving reality and spacetime manipulation. Derek has the ability to create rifts (tears in the space-time continuum) which allow him to travel through any place he wants as long as he knows where it is. He can also teleport to other people's locations as long as he knows who they are; he did not know where his best friend was but when he imagined her face, he immediately teleported to her location. He can also use rifts for offensive abilities, like cutting off people or redirecting their attacks back at them. Sideways also has super strength and durability as well. When Derek creates a rift on top of another rift, it can create a miniature black hole.

Critical reception
The character has been commonly compared to Marvel Comics character Spider-Man, specifically the Ultimate version, evoking both his costume design and personality. The character and comic initially received mixed reviews, with the first issue averaging 7 out of 10 according to review aggregator Comic Book Roundup. Over time, the series received generally positive reviews with an average rating of 7.4 out of 10. In a review of the first issue for IGN, Blair Marnell praised Rocafort's art but said the teenage dialogue was "so far off of the mark that it borders on self-parody". Bleeding Cool called the character "charming" but the story "meandering". It went on to say Rocafort's art is fantastic but not the best fit for the comic's tone. The character is part of an effort to increase diversity within the fictional setting and has received attention for being a minority character drawn by a Puerto Rican artist.

References

DC Comics characters who can teleport
DC Comics characters with superhuman strength
DC Comics male superheroes
Comics characters introduced in 2018
Puerto Rican superheroes
2018 comics debuts
DC Comics titles
Fictional characters with dimensional travel abilities